The Village Priest (Spanish: El cura de aldea) is a 1927 Spanish silent drama film directed by Florián Rey.

Cast
Manuel Alares 
Leo de Córdoba
Luis Infiesta
Alfonso Orozco
Rafael Pérez Chaves
Carmen Rico
Elisa Ruiz Romero
Marina Torres  
Constante Viñas

References

External links

1927 drama films
Spanish silent films
Spanish drama films
Films directed by Florián Rey
Films based on Spanish novels
Spanish black-and-white films
Silent drama films
1920s Spanish-language films